The 2021 Antalya Challenger III was a professional tennis tournament played on clay courts. It was the third edition of the tournament which was part of the 2021 ATP Challenger Tour. It took place in Antalya, Turkey between 29 November and 5 December 2021.

Singles main-draw entrants

Seeds

1 Rankings as of 22 November 2021.

Other entrants
The following players received wildcards into the singles main draw:
  Yankı Erel
  Cem İlkel
  Aleksandre Metreveli

The following players received entry into the singles main draw as alternates:
  Hsu Yu-hsiou
  Lee Duck-hee

The following players received entry from the qualifying draw:
  Tiago Cação
  Oliver Crawford
  Mick Veldheer
  Louis Wessels

Champions

Singles

 Nuno Borges def.  Ryan Peniston 6–4, 6–3.

Doubles

 Riccardo Bonadio /  Giovanni Fonio def.  Hsu Yu-hsiou /  Tseng Chun-hsin 3–6, 6–2, [12–10].

References

2021 ATP Challenger Tour
2021 in Turkish tennis
November 2021 sports events in Asia
December 2021 sports events in Asia